Emerson John Moore (May 16, 1938 – September 14, 1995) was an African-American prelate of the Roman Catholic Church. An auxiliary bishop of the Archdiocese of New York (1982–1995), he was the first African American monsignor and the first to serve as a Catholic bishop in New York. He was also one of the first and only Catholic bishops publicly known to have died of HIV/AIDS complications.

Biography

Early life and education
Raised in a Baptist family, Emerson Moore was born in the Harlem section of New York City, the son of a subway motorman and a hospital nurse. He was raised in the Bronx, where he attended Cardinal Hayes High School. He converted to Catholicism at age 15 in 1953.

Moore studied for the priesthood at Cathedral College in Manhattan and at St. Joseph's Seminary in Yonkers. He also earned a Master of Social Work degree from Columbia University and a Master of Public Administration degree from New York University.

Priesthood
On May 30, 1964, Moore was ordained a priest by Cardinal Francis Spellman at St. Patrick's Cathedral. He then served as a curate at St. Augustine Church in Ossining and at the Church of the Holy Family in Manhattan.

In 1968, Moore joined with the National Black Catholic Clergy Caucus in describing the Catholic Church in the United States a "white racist institution." In 1969, he became director of the Lt. Joseph P. Kennedy Jr. Memorial Community Center and of the central office of Catholic Charities, both in Harlem. He also founded the Office for Black Ministry in the Archdiocese of New York.

In 1975, Moore was named pastor of St. Charles Borromeo Church, also known as "Harlem's Cathedral." He was once described by Cardinal John J. O'Connor as "the most popular preacher in town." In 1978, Moore was elevated to the rank of monsignor, becoming the first African American to receive that honor. In 1979, Moore welcomed Pope John Paul II to Harlem, where the Pope gave an address to African Americans at St. Charles Borromeo.

Episcopacy
On July 3, 1982, Moore was appointed auxiliary bishop of New York and titular bishop of Curubis by John Paul II. He received his episcopal consecration on the following September 8 from Cardinal Terence Cooke, with Archbishop John Joseph Maguire and Bishop Harold Robert Perry serving as co-consecrators. He was the sixth African American to serve as a Catholic bishop in the United States and the first to serve in the Archdiocese of New York. As an auxiliary bishop, he continued to serve as pastor of St. Charles Borromeo, a post which he held until 1989. He also served as archdiocesan vicar for NYC's Black Catholics, a board member of Catholic Relief Services, chairman of the Africa Development Council, and a member of the New York State Commission on Government Integrity.

During the 1984 presidential election, Moore supported Democratic civil rights activist Jesse Jackson, because Jackson was "the only one forcing people to look at hard issues." That same year, he was arrested alongside City Clerk David Dinkins during a protest against apartheid outside of the South African consulate in Manhattan. In 1990, he was the only bishop to sign an appeal made by Call to Action for major reforms in the Catholic Church, including the ordination of women and the repeal of clerical celibacy.

Addictions and AIDS
Moore suffered from a substance abuse problem for several years, and was addicted to alcohol and cocaine. He would disappear periodically from his public ministry to seek treatment, often missing events and suffering from financial difficulties. He also suffered from AIDS, though it is unknown how he contracted the disease.

In early 1994, Moore entered the Hazelden Foundation, a drug and alcohol treatment center in Center City, Minnesota, as a long-term patient.

Death 
In 1995, he died at Hazelden due to complications from AIDS, aged 57.

The Archdiocese of New York, in an official announcement following his death, quoted the death certificate in saying he had died of "natural causes of unknown origin". Cardinal O'Connor said he could not discuss the circumstances of Moore's death but he would not be ashamed if one of his priests or bishops had AIDS.

At Moore's funeral at St. Patrick's Cathedral, Cardinal O'Connor spoke of the hardships that Moore faced as an African American bishop in the Catholic Church, saying: "It is not enough that a black bishop be ordinarily intelligent. He is expected to be extraordinarily intelligent. It is not enough for him to preach adequately; he must preach brilliantly. It is not enough for him to be polite; he must be the essence of courtesy. If he speaks with pride of being black, he's racist; if he supports civil rights, he's a threat. If he praises white people, he's an Uncle Tom. He is expected to be a paragon of priestliness, yet be more human than the weakest among us. In short, if he cannot walk on water, he's an utter failure; if he walks on water too easily, he has forgotten his 'place'."

References

1938 births
1995 deaths
People from Harlem
African-American Roman Catholic bishops
20th-century American Roman Catholic titular bishops
AIDS-related deaths in Minnesota
Converts to Roman Catholicism from Baptist denominations
People of the Roman Catholic Archdiocese of New York
20th-century African-American people